The Diamonds and Pearls Tour was a concert tour by American recording artist Prince and The New Power Generation promoting his Diamonds and Pearls album, released the previous year. The tour itinerary were scheduled dates in Asia, Europe, and for the first time, Australia. Like several of his then-recent tours, Prince chose not to tour the United States, the exception being the Lovesexy Tour in 1988. It would be 1993's Act I Tour before Prince did a full tour of the United States.

History
More extravagant than the previous year's Nude Tour, the Diamonds and Pearls Tour had more expensive set design, and additional band members. The setlist focused mainly on songs from the album, but was spattered with a number of greatest hits. Most songs were played in their entirety. Prince added a new horn section to the band and promoted a new hip hop image with raps by Tony M. The concerts were preceded with footage and teases from his forthcoming album, indicating that videos had already been shot and ready to be released.

Opening act
Carmen Electra (select venues)
The Naked Mazurs (select venues)
Djaambi (select venues)

Band
 Prince — vocals, piano, and guitar
Levi Seacer Jr. — guitar and vocals
 Sonny T. — bass guitar and vocals
 Rosie Gaines — keyboards, organ, and vocals
 Tommy Barbarella — keyboards
 Michael Bland — drums, percussion
 Tony M. — dancing and lead raps
 Kirky J. and Damon Dickson — dance and vocals
 The NPG Hornz — brass
 Mayte Garcia, Diamond and Pearl — dancing

After the departure of the remaining members of The Revolution after 1990's Nude Tour, Prince decided to officially dub this new band The New Power Generation. Most of the band transferred over from the Nude Tour. Levi Seacer Jr. was switched from bass to guitar to replace the departed Miko Weaver while Sonny T. took over for Levi on bass. Tommy Barbarella was brought in as a replacement for Doctor Fink on keyboards.

Prince added a new horn section to the band, dubbed the NPG Hornz who, while not being active on the Diamonds and Pearls album, would contribute greatly to Prince's albums for several years.

Dancers Diamond, Lori Elle, and Pearl, Robia LaMorte, served as spokespersons for Prince during the tour while also performing in the album's videos while Mayte, then-newest member of the NPG Band was a troupe dancer who was being promoted for his next project that same summer of 1992.

Set lists
Setlist of 24 April 1992, at the Entertainment Centre, Sydney, Australia

 "Take My Hand, Precious Lord" (Introduction)
 "Thunder"
 "Daddy Pop"
 "Diamonds and Pearls"
 "Let's Go Crazy"
 "Kiss"
 "Jughead" (Includes "Dead on It" intro)
 "Purple Rain"
 "Live 4 Love"
 "Willing and Able" (Includes "Lively Up Yourself" intro)
 Interlude
 "Nothing Compares 2 U" 
 "Sexy M.F."
 "Thieves in the Temple" (Includes snippets of "It")
 Medley
"A Night in Tunisia" / "Strollin'" (Instrumental)
 "Insatiable"
 "Gett Off" (Includes snippets of "Gett Off (Houstyle)" and "The Flow")

Encore I

 "Cream" (Includes "La, La, La, He, He, Hee" interpolation)
 "Chain of Fools" (Vocals by Rosie Gaines)

Encore II

 Medley 
"1999" / "Baby I'm a Star" / "Push" (Includes "A Love Bizarre" and "My Name is Prince" interpolations) 
 Show coda (Includes "Peter Gunn Theme" interpolation)

Additional notes
On some dates, "Damn U" was performed in place of "Nothing Compares 2 U"
Starting the UK Dates, "Delirious" was performed in place of Willing and Able on some dates, after the Stuttgart show it was performed for the remainder of the tour. 
On a few dates of the tour, "Bambi" was performed after "Live 4 Love" or in replacement of "Live 4 Love"

Tour dates

Rescheduled/Cancelled

References

External links
Prince Tour History

Prince (musician) concert tours
1992 concert tours